Poozhikol, also known as Karikkakuzhi, is a remote place in India, which lies in both Kaduthuruthy and Mulakkulam Panchayats in Kottayam district of Kerala.

Location
Poozhikol lies in between Appanchira on the south-west, Keezhoor (Njarukunnu) on the north and Mangadu on the east.

Transportation
The village, once very remote and agrarian, is now very well connected to near towns by roads. Now a KSRTC venad bus  is running a service.

History
All the developmental institutions were attributed to the forefathers of the present generation with the efforts of Late Fr.Lukose Manalel, aka Manalel achan, and Fr. Jacob Kollaparambil.

Schools
There is a lower primary school named St.Luke's LP School and upper primary school named St.Martha's UP School. It has a school for the mentally challenged and an old age home.

Churches
Poozhikkol has  Syro Malabar Churches that belongs to both Kottayam and Pala Dioceses. Ex-Minister of Kerala Mr. Monse Joseph belongs from this place.

Celebrities
Former Chief Justice of India Shri K.G Balakrishnan also belong from Poozhikol.

References

Villages in Kottayam district